The Räte-Zeitung (Councils' Newspaper) was a left-wing magazine published from April 1919 until late 1920. It was launched by Philipp Dengel and  Alfons Goldschmidt. Leo Matthias joined the editorial team. It proclaimed itself the "Organ of the Workers' Councils". It was one of the main vehicles promoting the activities of German Expressionism – an avant-garde art movement – to the working class.

Contributors
The following were contributors:
Franz Jung
Karl Kautsky
Frederick Wendel
Karl Radek
Alexander Bloch
Kurt Hiller
Hanns Bruno Herfurth
Emil Dyrrlich (Berlin-Neuköln)
Arthur Holitscher
Ernst Toller
Otto Gross

References

External links
 Issue 2, 8 April 1919

1919 establishments in Germany
1920 disestablishments in Germany
German Revolution of 1918–1919
Defunct political magazines published in Germany
Communist magazines
Magazines established in 1919
Magazines disestablished in 1920
Magazines published in Berlin
German-language magazines